Talisman Desktop is a Windows shell replacement introduced in 1997 by Lighttek Software, designed to allow the user to configure its interface. It is available in a number of languages including English, French, Spanish, Swedish, Portuguese, Russian and Italian. Talisman Desktop is shareware, available as a free trial download that expires in 30 days. After which a license must be purchased.

The Talisman interface is freeform skinnable, and uses downloadable themes. Several themes are included with the download and more are available from the manufacturer's website and various other websites. Users can also create and edit their own themes.  Customizing the Talisman interface uses a graphical configuration dialog instead to a scripting system. Talisman is intended to be different from other launchers because that it can also be configured as a shell extension within Windows Explorer (much like a highly configurable launcher) or as a GUI replacement within Explorer (similar to WinStep).

Tailsman has always remained out of the limelight occupied by better known rivals like the free and open source shells LiteStep and Blackbox.  However, Talisman has maintained a userbase adequate to support continuous development since the software's introduction.

See also
Shell (computing)

References

External links

Shareware
Desktop shell replacement
Utilities for Windows
Windows-only software